Sibley Music Library is the library of the Eastman School of Music, Rochester, NY. It was founded in 1904 by Hiram Watson Sibley in honor of his father Hiram Sibley and is said to be the largest university music library in the US.

History
The library was originally placed in University of Rochester's Sibley Hall serving as both community and university music library. In January 1922 the then-small collection was moved from its original home to the newly instituted Eastman School of Music in central Rochester.

By 1937 the library had outgrown its space within the Eastman School premises, and an annex was erected at 44 Swan Street, the adjacent block. At that time the library was renamed from Sibley Musical Library to Sibley Music Library. Even after major renovations made to that building in 1976, the library once again outgrew its space, and eventually plans were made to erect a third building. The library moved to its current location in 1989 and now occupies 45,000 square feet (4,000 m²) on the 2nd, 3rd and 4th floors of the Miller Center, formerly known as Eastman Place.

Head librarians
 Barbara Duncan (1922-1947)
 Ruth Watanabe (1947-1984)
 Mary Wallace Davidson (1984-1999)
 Dan Zager (1999-2021)
 Jon Sauceda (2021- )

References

External links
 Official website
 Sibley Music Library digital collections

Libraries in New York (state)
University of Rochester
University and college academic libraries in the United States
Music libraries in the United States
Educational buildings in Rochester, New York
Library buildings completed in 1937
Library buildings completed in 1989
Music organizations based in the United States